The Europe/Africa Zone was one of three zones of regional competition in the 1995 Fed Cup.

Group I
Venue: La Manga Club, Murcia, Spain (outdoor clay)
Date: 17–21 April

The sixteen teams were divided into four pools of four teams. The top teams of each pool play-off in a two-round knockout stage to decide which nation progresses to World Group II play-offs. Nations finishing in the bottom place in each pool were relegated to Europe/Africa Zone Group II for 1996.

Pools

Knockout stage

  and  advanced to World Group II Play-offs.

Group II
Venue: Nairobi Club, Nairobi, Kenya (outdoor clay)
Date: 8–13 May

The twenty teams were divided into four pools of five. The top two teams from each pool then moved on to the play-off stage of the competition. The four teams that won one match from the play-off stage would advance to Group I for 1996.

Pools

Play-offs

See also
Fed Cup structure

References

 Fed Cup Profile, Slovenia
 Fed Cup Profile, Czech Republic
 Fed Cup Profile, Great Britain
 Fed Cup Profile, Hungary
 Fed Cup Profile, Russia
 Fed Cup Profile, Georgia
 Fed Cup Profile, Belarus
 Fed Cup Profile, Latvia
 Fed Cup Profile, Switzerland
 Fed Cup Profile, Belgium
 Fed Cup Profile, Romania
 Fed Cup Profile, Croatia
 Fed Cup Profile, Greece
 Fed Cup Profile, Norway
 Fed Cup Profile, Morocco
 Fed Cup Profile, Tunisia
 Fed Cup Profile, Portugal
 Fed Cup Profile, Luxembourg
 Fed Cup Profile, Zimbabwe
 Fed Cup Profile, Estonia
 Fed Cup Profile, Denmark
 Fed Cup Profile, Macedonia
 Fed Cup Profile, Turkey
 Fed Cup Profile, Lithuania
 Fed Cup Profile, Ireland
 Fed Cup Profile, Yugoslavia
 Fed Cup Profile, Malta
 Fed Cup Profile, Kenya

External links
 Fed Cup website

 
Europe Africa
Sport in Nairobi
Tennis tournaments in Kenya
Sport in Murcia
Tennis tournaments in Spain
Fed